Heritage of the Desert is a 1932 American Pre-Code Western film directed by Henry Hathaway and starring Randolph Scott and Sally Blane. This was the first movie that Henry Hathaway (director of the original True Grit) directed.

Filmed on location in Red Rock Canyon State Park in California, Heritage of the Desert provided Randolph Scott with his first starring role. Released by Paramount Pictures, the film is a remake of Paramount's successful silent version from 1924 which utilised early two-strip technicolor. One of hundreds of Paramount films made between 1929 and 1949, tied up in legal limbo by Universal which controls them.

Plot
Based on the novel Heritage of the Desert by Zane Grey, the film is about a rancher whose spread includes the only way out of the valley where an outlaw is hiding a huge herd of stolen cattle. When the outlaw decides to challenge the rancher's claim to the land, the rancher stays one step ahead of him and hires a surveyor to remap and confirm the property lines.

Cast
 Randolph Scott as Jack Hare
 Sally Blane as Judy
 J. Farrell MacDonald as Adam Naab
 David Landau as Judson "Judd" Holderness
 Gordon Westcott as Snap Naab
 Guinn 'Big Boy' Williams as Lefty
 Vince Barnett as Windy

References

External links
 
 
 

1932 films
Films based on works by Zane Grey
1932 directorial debut films
American black-and-white films
Films based on American novels
Films directed by Henry Hathaway
Paramount Pictures films
1932 Western (genre) films
American Western (genre) films
1930s English-language films
1930s American films